Saint-Aimé is a municipality in the Pierre-De Saurel Regional County Municipality, in Montérégie, Quebec. The population as of the Canada 2021 Census was 545.

Demographics

Population
Population trend:

Language
Mother tongue language (2021)

See also
List of municipalities in Quebec

References

Incorporated places in Pierre-De Saurel Regional County Municipality
Municipalities in Quebec